The Venerable Shin Ditha Pamauk (also spelled as Disapramok) was the Chief Primate of the Pagan Empire during the reign of King Narathihapate (1256–87). The monk led the peace negotiations with the Mongols in 1285–87, culminating in the meeting with Emperor Kublai Khan in 1287.

Background
Little is known about the monk's background except that he was from Thitseingyi in present-day Shwebo Township. According to one tradition, his personal name was Kyi-Bwei, and he wrote the first known commentary on Burmese grammar and spelling called Pubbaganhta Diga (Pali: Pubbaganthaṭīkā), commonly known in Burmese as Thinbongyi Diga, for which he was conferred the title "Ditha Pamaukkha" by King Kyaswa (r. 1235–51). Of the main royal chronicles, only Zatadawbon Yazawin mentions Ditha Pamauk by name, saying that the monk was Narathihapate's teacher. It is unclear if he was the same monk who wrote the grammar book, or another monk who succeeded the title.

The earliest archaeological evidence about him was a 1278/79 inscription, which refers to him as Yaza Guru ("Royal Teacher"), and states that he had spent two years since 1276/77 in the Minbu region in present-day central Myanmar to ask for land donations there.

Peace negotiations

The monk led the peace negotiations with the Mongol Empire in 1285–87. The Mongols had occupied northern Burma to Tagaung and Hanlin, following their successful dry-season campaigns in 1283–85. The king had fled to Lower Burma, and decided to sue for peace by November 1285.

Ceasefire talks at Tagaung
The ceasefire negotiations began in November/December 1285 at Tagaung. The initial Burmese delegation was led by senior ministers and generals Ananda Pyissi and Maha Bo. The Mongol commanders agreed to a ceasefire but demanded a full submission. Ditha Pamauk later joined the negotiations, carrying a gold-leaf memorial for the emperor. The Mongol commanders rejected it because the memorial did not explicitly say that the Burmese king had sent it to the emperor as tribute. The Mongols impressed upon the Burmese delegation that they had 20,000 troops ready to invade further south. A tentative agreement had been reached between the commanders by 3 March 1286. The Burmese agreed to the suzerainty of the Mongol Empire over the Pagan Empire, as well as northern and central parts of the country to be organized as Mongol provinces of Zhengmian and Mianzhong, as well as to send a formal delegation to the emperor's court.

Mission to Beijing
At Hlegya, west of Prome (Pyay), the Burmese king deliberated the terms for about three months. He was resigned to submit to the emperor but wanted the occupation forces out of northern Burma. In return, he was willing to pay annual taxes tied to the agricultural output of the country. The task of convincing the emperor would now fall to Ditha Pamauk. In June 1286, he sent an embassy led by the monk and Ananda Pyissi to Beijing. As demanded, the king also sent a gold-leaf memorial stating his allegiance to the emperor. The delegation traveled by Thitseingyi, Hanlin, Momeit, Tagaung to Yunnan. They spent the rest of the Buddhist Lent in Yachan (considered to be on the shores of the Dian Lake). The embassy, without Ananda Pyissi who for some reason remained in Yunnan, resumed the journey after Lent, and arrived at Dadu (modern Beijing) in December/January 1287.

Emperor Kublai Khan received the delegation in January 1287. The monk presented the Burmese king's gold-leaf memorial of allegiance addressed to the emperor. The monk then proceeded to persuade the emperor to withdraw his troops from the Pagan territory. He argued that the presence of occupation troops would retard resumption of agriculture in northern Burma, and that the Burmese king would pay annual taxes tied to the agricultural output of the country if the troops were to leave. The monk also appealed to the emperor's religious leanings, saying that not only would a prosperous Pagan feed his troops in Yunnan but also restore the health of Buddhism. The emperor agreed to withdraw the troops. To be sure, it is not clear whether the emperor agreed to withdraw the troops solely due to the monk's appeals. The "concession" may just have been a negotiation ploy. The emperor's actions elsewhere in Southeast Asia suggest that he did not want to deploy his troops for long occupations, and preferred vassal rulers instead.

The delegation arrived back at Hlegya in May 1287. Pleased with the terms, the king donated 568 hectares in the Mu valley, then under Mongol occupation, along with livestock and serfs, to the monk. (The king died a few weeks later. On what was to be his return trip to Pagan, he was assassinated en route at Prome on 1 July 1287 by Thihathu, one of his sons.)

Later years

The monk made it back to Pagan. He left an inscription at a monastery near the Mingalazedi Pagoda in Pagan. The inscription, now at the Bagan Archaeological Museum and known as the Disapramok Inscription, provides a detailed account of the peace negotiations at Tagaung, and at Beijing. It also states the land donations made by the late king, and mentions the completion of the ordination hall, partially donated by the dowager queen Pwa Saw, as well as an impending construction of a school, both near the Mingalazedi Pagoda. It is not clear if the monk remained as the Primate when the next king, Kyawswa, came to power in 1289.

Commemorations
 Shin Ditha Pamauk Hall, at the office of the Ministry of Foreign Affairs in Yangon

Notes

References

Bibliography
 
 
 
 
 
 
 
 
 
 

Theravada Buddhist monks
Burmese Buddhist monks
Pagan dynasty
Burmese diplomats
People from Sagaing Region
13th-century Burmese people